Kim Jin-sung (born March 7, 1985) is South Korean professional baseball pitcher for the NC Dinos of the KBO League.

References

External links
Career statistics and player information from Korea Baseball Organization
Kim Jin-sung at ncdinos.com 

NC Dinos players
KBO League pitchers
South Korean baseball players
Baseball players from Seoul
1985 births
Living people